Zarrin Gol (also Romanized as Zarrīn Gol and Zarīn Gol; also known as Zaringul, Zarringul, and Zarrīn Kol) is a village in Khararud Rural District, in the Central District of Khodabandeh County, Zanjan Province, Iran. At the 2006 census, its population was 1402, with 291 families.

References 

Populated places in Khodabandeh County